Allopogon is a genus of flies belonging to the family Asilidae.

Species
Allopogon anomalus (Carrera, 1947)
Allopogon argyrocinctus (Schiner, 1867)
Allopogon basalis Curran, 1935
Allopogon castigans (Walker, 1851)
Allopogon equestris (Wiedemann, 1828)
Allopogon miles (Wiedemann, 1828)
Allopogon necans (Wiedemann, 1828)
Allopogon placidus (Wulp, 1882)
Allopogon tesselatus (Wiedemann, 1828)
Allopogon vittatus (Wiedemann, 1828)

References

Asilidae
Taxa named by Christian Rudolph Wilhelm Wiedemann